Lay Down with the Strawbs is a live album by English band Strawbs. It was recorded at Robin 2 in Bilston and features the "Hero and Heroine line-up" of the band with a guest appearance of former member John Ford.

Track listing

Disc one
"Lay Down" (Dave Cousins)
"I Only Want My Love to Grow in You" (Cousins, Chas Cronk)
"Shine on Silver Sun" (Cousins)
"Ghosts" (Cousins)
"Remembering/And You and I (When We Were Very Young)" (John Hawken/Cousins)
"Cold Steel" (Dave Lambert)
"Impressions of Southall from the Train/The Life Auction" (Cousins)
"Out in the Cold/Round and Round" (Cousins)
"Just Love" (Lambert)

Disc two
"Autumn" (Cousins)
"Raq's Aswad Drum Solo" (Rod Coombes)
"Hero and Heroine" (Cousins)
"Round and Round (reprise)" (Cousins)
"Part of the Union" (Richard Hudson, John Ford)
"The Man Who Called Himself Jesus" (Cousins)
"Tears and Pavane" (Cousins, Hudson, Ford)
"Kissed by the Sun"
"Heavy Disguise" (Ford)

Personnel
Strawbs
Dave Cousins – lead vocals, backing vocals, guitar, banjo
Dave Lambert – lead vocals, backing vocals, guitar
John Hawken – keyboards
Chas Cronk – backing vocals, bass guitar
Rod Coombes – drums

Additional personnel
John Ford – lead vocals, backing vocals, guitar

Release history

References
Lay Down with the Strawbs on Strawbsweb

2008 live albums
Strawbs live albums